Hornbeams are hardwood trees in the flowering plant genus Carpinus in the birch family Betulaceae. The 30–40 species occur across much of the temperate regions of the Northern Hemisphere.

Origin of names 
The common English name hornbeam derives from the hardness of the woods (likened to horn) and the Old English beam, "tree" (cognate with Dutch ‘’Boom’’ and German Baum).

The American hornbeam is also occasionally known as blue-beech, ironwood, or musclewood, the first from the resemblance of the bark to that of the American beech Fagus grandifolia, the other two from the hardness of the wood and the muscled appearance of the trunk and limbs.

The botanical name for the genus, Carpinus, is the original Latin name for the European species, although some etymologists derive it from the Celtic for a yoke.

Taxonomy 
Formerly some taxonomists segregated them with the genera Corylus (hazels) and Ostrya (hop-hornbeams) in a separate family, Corylaceae.  However, modern botanists place Carpinus in the birch subfamily Coryloideae. Species of Carpinus are often grouped into two subgenera Carpinus subgenus Carpinus  and Carpinus subgenus  Distegicarpus.

However,  phylogentic analysis has shown that Ostrya likely evolved from a Carpinus ancestor somewhere in C. subg.  Distegicarpus making Carpinus paraphyletic.  The fossil record of the genus extends back to the Early Eocene, Ypresian of northwestern North America, with the species Carpinus perryae described from fossil fruits found in the Klondike Mountain Formation of Republic, Washington.

Description 

Hornbeams are small to medium-sized trees, Carpinus betulus reaching a height of 32 m. The leaves are deciduous, alternate, and simple with a serrated margin, and typically vary from 3 to 10 cm in length.

The flowers are wind-pollinated pendulous catkins, produced in spring. The male and female flowers are on separate catkins, but on the same tree (monoecious).

The fruit is a small nut about 3–6 mm long, held in a leafy bract; the bract may be either trilobed or simple oval, and is slightly asymmetrical. The asymmetry of the seedwing makes it spin as it falls, improving wind dispersal. The shape of the wing is important in the identification of different hornbeam species. Typically, 10–30 seeds are on each seed catkin.

Distribution 
The 30–40 species occur across much of the temperate regions of the northern hemisphere, with the greatest number of species in east Asia, particularly China. Only two species occur in Europe, only one in eastern North America, and one in Mesoamerica. Carpinus betulus can be found in Europe, Turkey and Ukraine.

Associated insects 
Hornbeams are used as food plants by the larvae of some Lepidoptera species, including autumnal moth, common emerald, feathered thorn, walnut sphinx, Svensson's copper underwing, and winter moth (recorded on European hornbeam) as well as the Coleophora case-bearers C. currucipennella and C. ostryae.

Applications 

Hornbeams yield a very hard timber, giving rise to the name "ironwood". Dried heartwood billets are nearly white and are suitable for decorative use. For general carpentry, hornbeam is rarely used, partly due to the difficulty of working it.

The wood is used to construct carving boards, tool handles, handplane soles, coach wheels, piano actions, shoe lasts, and other products where a very tough, hard wood is required.

The wood can also be used as gear pegs in simple machines, including traditional windmills. It is sometimes coppiced to provide hardwood poles. It is also used in parquet flooring and for making chess pieces.

Species 
Accepted species:

Carpinus betulus  – European hornbeam - Europe to Western Asia; naturalized in North America.
Carpinus caroliniana  – American hornbeam - Eastern North America
Carpinus chuniana  – Guangdong, Guizhou, Hubei
Carpinus cordata  – Sawa hornbeam - Primorye, China, Korea, Japan
Carpinus dayongiana  – Hunan
Carpinus eximia  – Korea
Carpinus faginea  – Nepal, Himalayas of northern India
Carpinus fangiana  – Sichuan, Guangxi
Carpinus hebestroma  – Taiwan
Carpinus henryana  – southern China
Carpinus japonica Blume – Japanese hornbeam - Japan
Carpinus kawakamii  – Taiwan, southeastern China
Carpinus kweichowensis  – Guizhou, Yunnan
Carpinus langaoensis  – Shaanxi, China
Carpinus laxiflora   – Aka-shide hornbeam - Japan, Korea
Carpinus lipoensis  – Guizhou
Carpinus londoniana  – southern China, northern Indochina
Carpinus luochengensis  – Guangxi
Carpinus mengshanensis  – Shandong
Carpinus microphylla  – Guangxi
Carpinus mollicoma  – Tibet, Sichuan, Yunnan
Carpinus monbeigiana  – Tibet, Yunnan
Carpinus omeiensis  – Sichuan, Guizhou
Carpinus orientalis  – Oriental hornbeam - Hungary, Balkans, Italy, Crimea, Turkey, Iran, Caucasus
Carpinus paohsingensis  – China
†Carpinus perryae  - Ypresian, Klondike Mountain Formation
Carpinus polyneura  – southern China
Carpinus pubescens  – China, Vietnam
Carpinus purpurinervis  – Guizhou, Guangxi
Carpinus putoensis  – Putuo hornbeam - Zhejiang
Carpinus rankanensis  – Taiwan
Carpinus rupestris  – Yunnan, Guangxi, Guizhou
Carpinus shensiensis  – Gansu, Shaanxi
Carpinus shimenensis  – Hunan
†Carpinus tengshongensis  – Pliocene Yunnan Province
Carpinus tropicalis  – Mexico, Central America
Carpinus tsaiana  – Yunnan, Guizhou
Carpinus tschonoskii  – Chonowski's hornbeam - China, Korea, Japan
Carpinus turczaninovii  – Korean hornbeam, - China, Korea, Japan
Carpinus viminea  – China, Korea, Himalayas, northern Indochina

References

External links 

 

 
Taxa named by Carl Linnaeus